King Changó is the self-titled debut album of Latin ska band King Changó.

Track listing
 "Don't Drop Your Pants" (J.A. Blanco, Glenda Lee, R. Verde) – 4:02
 "Confesión" (King Changó) – 5:40
 "God Damn Killers" (J.A. Blanco, Verde) – 3:41
 "So Sweet" (J.A. Blanco, Michael Cunningham, Verde) – 5:24
 "Empty Hands Are My Weapon" (King Changó) – 5:46
 "Melting Pot Intro" (J.A. Blanco, Martin Cunningham) – 0:53
 "Melting Pot" (J.A. Blanco, Luis Eduardo Blanco, Ma. Cunningham, Lee) – 3:42
 "Revolution/Cumbia Reggae" (J.A. Blanco, L.E. Blanco, Lee, Luis Jesús Ruíz) – 3:14
 "African Fever" (King Changó) – 1:46
 "Pisando la Serpiente" (J.A. Blanco, Ma. Cunningham, Lee, Verde, Mike Wagner) – 3:50
 "Latin Ska" (J.A. Blanco, Verde) – 4:28
 "Torero" (J.A. Blanco, L.E. Blanco, Wagner) – 3:12
 "French Lady" (J.A. Blanco, Lee, Verde, Wagner) - 10:58

References

1996 debut albums
Luaka Bop albums
Warner Records albums